Verona Area High School (VAHS) is a high school in Verona, Wisconsin, United States. It is part of the Verona Area School District.

Academics
Accredited by the North Central Association, VAHS offers a core curriculum in grades 9 through 12 that does not track students by ability; instead, advanced opportunities are offered within the curriculum of each course. Consequently, VAHS courses do not carry designations such as "Honors" in their titles. Grade 9 and 10 students in core classes are taught in teams of English/social studies and math/science instructors. Students in the 11th and 12th grades have the opportunity to take Advanced Placement courses in English language, English literature, world history, chemistry, biology, physics B, physics C, statistics, psychology, calculus AB, and calculus BC.

Athletics
VAHS has 22 athletics programs and a staff of 65 coaches. Each program consists of a varsity team, a junior varsity team, and, for some sports, one or more freshman teams.

In the 2008-09 school year, VAHS became a member of the Big Eight Conference, moving from the Badger South Conference. The school athletic teams were originally nicknamed the Verona Indians, but this was changed in 1991 to the Verona Wildcats.

State championships
 Basketball (girls): 2016
 Cross country (boys): 1974, 1982, 1991
 Cross country (girls): 1980, 1981, 1984 
 Golf (girls): 2014
 Hockey (boys): 2014, 2020
 Lacrosse (boys): 2004, 2005, 2011, 2014, 2018
 Soccer (boys): 2019, 2022
 Soccer (girls): 2010 
 Swimming (boys): 1993, 2000
 Swimming (girls): 1998
 Track & field (boys): 1992, 1999, 2010 (wheelchair)
 Track & field (girls): 1984, 1985, 1991

Notable alumni
Ben Rortvedt, Major League Baseball player for the Minnesota Twins
Casey FitzRandolph, gold medalist speed skater at the 2002 Winter Olympic Games
Nick Schmaltz, member of the Chicago Blackhawks of the NHL (2016–present)
Jack Skille, member of the Vancouver Canucks of the NHL (2016–present); former member of the Chicago Blackhawks (2007-2011), Florida Panthers (2011-2013), Columbus Blue Jackets (2013-2015), and Colorado Avalanche (2015-2016)
Derek Stanley, former NFL wide receiver with the St. Louis Rams (2007-2009)
Eric Studesville, assistant coach with the Denver Broncos (2010–present); he was the interim head coach for the last four games of the 2010 season
Neil Walker, gold & silver medalist swimmer at the 2000 Summer Olympics; gold & bronze medalist swimmer at the 2004 Summer Olympics
Joe Wineke, Wisconsin politician

References

External links

Public high schools in Wisconsin
Schools in Dane County, Wisconsin